Nizhnyaya Vorobzha is a rural locality in Chernitsynsky Selsoviet Rural Settlement, Oktyabrsky District, Kursk Oblast, Russia. Population:

Geography 
The village is located on the Vorobzha River (a left tributary of the Seym River), 72 km from the Russia–Ukraine border, 16 km south-west of Kursk, 1 km south-west of the district center – the urban-type settlement Pryamitsyno, 3.5 km from the selsoviet center – Chernitsyno.

 Streets
There are the following streets in the locality: Selskaya, Yubileynaya and Zapolnaya (133 houses).

 Climate
Nizhnyaya Vorobzha has a warm-summer humid continental climate (Dfb in the Köppen climate classification).

Transport 
Nizhnyaya Vorobzha is located 10 km from the federal route  Crimea Highway (a part of the European route ), on the road of regional importance  (Kursk – Lgov – Rylsk – border with Ukraine), 2 km from the nearest railway station Dyakonovo (railway line Lgov I — Kursk).

The rural locality is situated 28 km from Kursk Vostochny Airport, 119 km from Belgorod International Airport and 228 km from Voronezh Peter the Great Airport.

References

Notes

Sources

Rural localities in Oktyabrsky District, Kursk Oblast